A constitutional referendum was held in the Comoros on 23 December 2001. The proposed amendments to the constitution were approved by 77% of voters, with a turnout of 75.4%.

Background
The amendments to the constitution provided for a federal state, with a large degree of autonomy for the three islands Anjouan, Grande Comore and Mohéli, each of which would have their own president and legislature. The national presidency would rotate between the three islands.

Results

References

Comoros
Referendums in the Comoros
Constitutional
Constitutional referendums in the Comoros